Prior of Monymusk (later, Commendator of Monymusk) was the head of the property and community of Augustinian canons of Monymusk Priory, Aberdeenshire. The following is a list of priors and commendators:

List of office holders

List of priors
 Máel Brigte (Bricius), 1210x1211-1222x
 Unknown abbots
 Alan, fl. 1268
 Unknown abbots
 Bernard, fl. 1345
 Andrew Cant, 1357-1365
 Unknown abbots
 David de Kynnard, x 1420
 Richard de Donery, 1420-1426
 Robert de Kilconkar, 1424-1429
 Robert de Paisley, 1427-1429 x 1430
 John de Tulach, 1429
 William de Cupar, 1430-1444 x 1450
 William Crannach, 1430
 William Couys (Cowes), 1430-1434
 Laurence de Cupar, 1430
 Robert de Keith, 1434
 John de Luoris (Luchris), 1444
 David Hay, 1450-1464 x 1469
 Thomas Straton, 1469
 Alexander Spens, 1469-1489 x 1491
 John Dugut, x1489
 William Kermichael (Carmichael), 1489
 Robert Fairweather, 1486-1490
 Laurence Valles, 1490
 Bartholomew de Putellis, 1491
 Richard Strathauchin, 1497-1499 x 1509
 John Aitkenheid, 1509-1523

List of commendators
 David Ferlie, 1522-1554 x 1558
 John Elphinstone, 1543-1554 x 1562
 Duncan Sviles, 1546
 John Stewart, 1558
 John Hay. 1558-1573
 Alexander Forbes, 1574-1577
 Robert Forbes, 1577-1614 x 1616

See also
 Monymusk Priory

Notes

References
 Cowan, Ian B. & Easson, David E., Medieval Religious Houses: Scotland With an Appendix on the Houses in the Isle of Man, Second rdition, (London, 1976), pp. 155–59
 Watt, D. E. R. & Shead, N. F. (eds.), The Heads of Religious Houses in Scotland from the 12th to the 16th Centuries, The Scottish Records Society, New Series, Volume 24, (Edinburgh, 2001), pp. 93–4

Monymusk
Monymusk
Monymusk
Lists of Scottish people